Börsenstraße (literally, "Stock Exchange Street") is a short side street to the Freßgass and Biebergasse major high-end shopping streets in the city centre of Frankfurt, Germany, in the district of Innenstadt and within the central business district known unofficially as the Bankenviertel (Banking District). It is named for the Frankfurt Stock Exchange, which is located here.

References

Streets in Frankfurt
Bankenviertel